In Japanese football, a large amount of rivalries have been formed during the last 20 years. The Japanese derbies are distinguished between national and local.

National

Verdy Kawasaki vs. Yokohama F. Marinos
Kashima Antlers vs. Júbilo Iwata
Urawa Red Diamonds vs. Gamba Osaka

Avispa Fukuoka vs. FC Tokyo

Local

References

Football competitions in Japan